Stella Polare (A 5313) is a yawl, active as a sails training vessel for the Italian Navy (Marina Militare).

History
Designed by Sparkman & Stephens Designs New York City (United States) as project 1505.1, Stella Polare was built for the Royal Ocean Racing Club as a first class a Bermuda-rigged yawl, built in wood. The vessel is the sister ship of Corsaro II, and was commissioned by Italian Navy to be used as a training ship for the students of the Italian Naval Academy in Livorno.

The original Arona generator was replaced by an Onan model. Stella Polare is a training vessel for cadets of the Italian Naval Academy in Livorno, spending regular periods aboard. Each year she embarks on a training cruise which often includes calls to various classic sailing rallies and regattas.

References

External links
Stella Polare (A 5313) Marina Militare website
 

Training ships of the Italian Navy
1965 ships
Sail training
Tall ships of Italy
Yawls